Hyacinths and Thistles is the second studio album by the indie rock band The 6ths. It was released in 2000 on Merge Records.

Track listing
All tracks written by Stephin Merritt.

Notes

2000 albums
The 6ths albums
Merge Records albums